Tatre is a village in the Municipality of Hrpelje-Kozina in the Littoral region of Slovenia close to the border with Croatia.

The local church is dedicated to Saint John the Evangelist and belongs to the Parish of Pregarje.

References

External links

Tatre on Geopedia

Populated places in the Municipality of Hrpelje-Kozina